John Comyn II of Badenoch (died 1302), nicknamed the Black Comyn, was a Scottish nobleman, a Guardian of Scotland, and one of the six Regents for Margaret, Maid of Norway. His father was John Comyn I of Badenoch.

Competitor for the Crown
In 1284 he joined with other Scottish noblemen who acknowledged Margaret of Norway as the heir of King Alexander. 
He was a Guardian of the Realm from 1286 to 1292. 
Comyn submitted to the English king in July 1296 at Montrose.

As a descendant of King Donald III, Comyn was one of the thirteen Competitors for the Crown of Scotland. 
He did not aggressively push his claim for fear of jeopardising that of his brother-in-law John Balliol.

Comyn, head of the most powerful noble family in Scotland, was a committed ally of Balliol and assisted him in his struggle against Edward I of England. 
It has even been suggested that the Comyn family were the driving force behind both the Balliol kingship and the revolt against Edward's demands. 
John Comyn is credited with the building of several large castles or castle houses in and around Inverness. 
Parts of Mortlach (Balvenie Castle) and Inverlochy Castle still stand today. 
John Comyn as his father was before him was entrusted by Alexander III of Scotland with the defence of Scotland's northern territories from invasion by the Vikings and the Danes.

Family
Comyn married Eleanor de Balliol, daughter of John I de Balliol of Barnard Castle, sister of King John of Scotland. 
Together they had two children:
John Comyn III of Badenoch, who married Lady Joan de Valence of Pembroke, daughter of William de Valence, 1st Earl of Pembroke, who was the half-brother to Henry III of England, and uncle of Edward I of England.
a daughter, married Sir Andrew Moray of Petty. Sir Andrew's second wife was called Euphemia de Clavering.  Euphemia was the widow of William Comyn, Lord of Kilbride and not the daughter of John Comyn II of Badenoch.

Death
John Comyn II of Badenoch died at Lochindorb Castle, in 1302.

Notes

References 

Rymer, Thomas,Foedera Conventiones, Literae et cuiuscunque generis Acta Publica inter Reges Angliae. London. 1745. (Latin)

External links
4. Clan Galbraith History: http://www.clangalbraith.org/GalbraithHistory/GalbraithHistory.htm

13th-century births
Year of birth unknown
1302 deaths
13th-century Scottish people
14th-century Scottish people
13th-century viceregal rulers
John II Comyn, Lord of Badenoch
Competitors for the Crown of Scotland
Guardians of Scotland
Regents of Scotland
Scottish people of the Wars of Scottish Independence
Lords of Badenoch